"That's What She Said" is the lead track on Welsh band the Automatic's debut album Not Accepted Anywhere. The track was recorded in Stir Studio in Cardiff.

Production

Meaning
The track drones of the unhappy day-to-day lives, waiting for the weekend to begin.

Release
The song itself was performed live for the first time at Cardiff club Barfly on New Year's Eve 2005.

On the "Recover" 2006 single, a recording from The Electric Ballroom in London of the track is featured as a B-side, where the song is played considerably faster live.

The track was featured on Kerrang!'''s CD New Breed.

The song's most notable performances include Later... with Jools Holland'' where the band replaced Keane, and in the US during SXSW from the Bat Bar.

Musicians
James Frostguitar, backing vocals
Robin Hawkinslead vocals, bass guitar
Iwan Griffithsdrums, percussion, vocals
Alex Penniekeyboards, vocals, synthesizers, backing percussion

Performance
With the departure of Alex Pennie, Paul Mullen uses a microKORG during the verse, then in the chorus switches to guitar, Paul also uses a vocoder during many of the vocal parts of the song whilst Rob sings lead vocals during the verse, Frost during the pre-chorus and then Rob again during the chorus.

References

The Automatic songs
2006 songs
Songs written by James Frost
Songs written by Iwan Griffiths
Songs written by Robin Hawkins
Songs written by Alex Pennie